Declan Danaher (born 11 January 1980) is a former rugby union footballer who played at back row for London Irish in the Aviva Premiership. He is currently Defence coach for the same team.

Club career
Danaher joined London Irish in 1999, making his debut against Gloucester Rugby in May 2000.

He started in the 2002 Powergen Cup Final at Twickenham, as London Irish defeated the Northampton Saints.

Danaher was on the losing side in the Finals of the 2005-06 European Challenge Cup and 2008–09 Guinness Premiership.

In July 2012, he was appointed the captain of London Irish for the 2012/13 Aviva Premiership Rugby Season.

International career
He has represented Ireland at U19 level and England at U21 level. Danaher also represented England A in 2002.

He was selected by Clive Woodward for the England squad for the 2002 Six Nations Championship and the Senior tour of Argentina in 2002.

Retirement

On 20 March 2014, at the age of 34, Declan announced his retirement due to a triceps tear.

References

External links
London Irish profile

1980 births
Living people
English rugby union players
Rugby union players from London
London Irish players
Rugby union flankers
English people of Irish descent
Alumni of City, University of London
Irish Exiles rugby union players